Polur may refer to:

Polur, a town in Tamil Nadu, India
Polur block, a revenue block in Tamil Nadu, India
Polur (state assembly constituency)
Polur taluk
Polur temple, Kozhikode, a temple in Kerala, India
Polur, Iran, a village in Iran

See also 
 Pulur (disambiguation)
 Pollur, a lake on the Faroe Islands